John Daly is a Gaelic footballer who plays for the Mountbellew–Moylough club and at senior level for the Galway county team.

He is the son of Val Daly, who also played for Galway and was also a manager.

John Daly played for Galway in the 2022 All-Ireland Senior Football Championship Final. The referee Sean Hurson took him to task in the closing stages and Jim McGuinness said this was unfair afterwards. Daly won an All Star Award at the end of the season, joining his father as a recipient.

Honours
Galway
Connacht Senior Football Championship (2): ?, 2022

Individual
All Star (1): 2022

References

1997 births
Living people
All Stars Awards winners (football)
Galway inter-county Gaelic footballers
Mountbellew–Moylough Gaelic footballers